Deborah M. Gordon (born December 30, 1955) is a biologist, appointed as a professor in the Department of Biology at Stanford University.

Major research 
Gordon studies ant colony behavior and ecology, with a particular focus on red harvester ants. She focuses on the developing behavior of colonies, even as individual ants change functions within their own lifetimes.

Gordon's fieldwork includes a long-term study of ant colonies in Arizona. She is the author of numerous articles and papers as well as the book Ants at Work for the general public, and she was profiled in The New York Times Magazine in 1999.

In 2012, she found that the foraging behavior of red harvester ants matches the TCP congestion control algorithm.

Education 
Gordon received a Ph.D. in zoology from Duke in 1983, an M.Sc. in Biology from Stanford in 1977 and a bachelor's degree from Oberlin College, where she majored in French.

She was a junior fellow of the Harvard Society of Fellows.

Awards and recognition 
In 1993, Gordon was named a Stanford MacNamara Fellow.  In 1995 Gordon received an award for teaching excellence from the Phi Beta Kappa Northern California Association. In 2001 Gordon was awarded a Guggenheim fellowship from the John Simon Guggenheim Memorial Foundation.  In 2003, Gordon was invited to speak at a TED conference. She is also an adviser to the Microbes Mind Forum.

Bibliography

References

External links 
 The Gordon Lab
 
 

1955 births
Living people
Myrmecologists
American entomologists
Women entomologists
Harvard Fellows
Duke University alumni
Oberlin College alumni
Stanford University alumni
Stanford University Department of Biology faculty
Center for Advanced Study in the Behavioral Sciences fellows